Lyudmila Ramiliyivna Bikmullina is a Ukrainian model of Russian roots who won the Miss Ukraine Universe 2007 title and the opportunity to represent Ukraine in the beauty pageant Miss Universe 2007 in Mexico. She married American millionaire Bill Kay, whom she met in Hong Kong, where she worked as a model. The couple has two children.

References

External links
Miss Universe about Lyudmila Bikmullina
Lyudmila's photographs from Miss Ukraine 2007

Living people
Miss Universe 2007 contestants
1986 births
Ukrainian people of Russian descent
Ukrainian female models
People from Kharkiv
Ukrainian beauty pageant winners
Russian female models